The Chinese Communist Party Admission Oath is an oath that prospective members of the Chinese Communist Party must take to become a party member according to Article 6 of the Constitution of the Chinese Communist Party.

There have been five versions of the admission oath used during different periods of history. The fifth and current version of the admission oath, adopted on September 6, 1982, during the 12th National Congress of the Chinese Communist Party, is translated into English as:

See also
 Constitutional oath of office of China
 Loyalty oath

References

External links
 CPC leaders takes Party admission oath at site of first CPC National Congress 

Chinese Communist Party
Oaths